The Whatshan River is a tributary of the Columbia River in the West Kootenay region of southeastern British Columbia.

Course
The Whatshan River flows generally south, passing through Whatshan Lake before joining the Columbia River in Lower Arrow Lake near the Needles Ferry.

Name origin
In 1865, explorer James Turnbull noted in his diary that his party was camping at the mouth of the What-shaan River. Walter Moberly's 1866 map labelled the lake and river as Waatshaan. In 1884, Gilbert Malcolm Sproat referred to the Whatch-shan stream. The present spelling first appears in George Dawson's 1889 report. The actual indigenous term these explorers were attempting to transcribe, and consequently its meaning, is unclear. A lake, river, peak, and mountain range have received the name.

See also
List of British Columbia rivers
Tributaries of the Columbia River

References

Rivers of British Columbia
Tributaries of the Columbia River